= List of television stations in Northern Ireland =

Television services in Northern Ireland are generally the same as those in the rest of the United Kingdom, with some variations, though services from the Republic of Ireland have been becoming increasingly available in recent years.

== Republic of Ireland Channels ==
The four main services have been available in many parts of Northern Ireland since their launch due to analogue overspill. In some cases, transmitters have been placed near the border in order to cover as much of Northern Ireland as possible. The channels (with the exception of Virgin Media) are also available on digital terrestrial, cable and satellite services throughout Northern Ireland, although some programmes are "blacked out" due to rights issues, such as some sporting events, Sunday's Gaelic football games and Australian soap opera Home and Away.

| Channel Name | Owner/Parent Co. | Freeview EPG Number | Sky EPG Number | Virgin EPG Number |
|---|---|---|---|---|
| RTÉ One | RTÉ | 60 (HD receiver required) | 161 | 875 |
| RTÉ Two | RTÉ | 61 (HD receiver required) | 162 | 876 |
| TG4 | Teilifís na Gaeilge | 62 (HD receiver required) | 163 | 877 |
